Suk Young-Jin (Hangul : 석영진; born  in Pohang) is a South Korean bobsledder.

Suk competed at the 2014 Winter Olympics for South Korea. He teamed with driver Won Yun-Jong, Jun Jung-Lin and Seo Young-Woo in the South Korea-1 sled in the four-man event, finishing 20th.

Suk made his World Cup debut in February 2012. As of April 2014, his best World Cup finish is 17th, in 2012-13 at Whistler.

References

1990 births
Living people
Olympic bobsledders of South Korea
People from Pohang
Bobsledders at the 2014 Winter Olympics
Bobsledders at the 2022 Winter Olympics
South Korean male bobsledders
Sportspeople from North Gyeongsang Province